Andrew or Andy Gardner may refer to:

Andrew Gardner (archaeologist), British archaeologist
Andrew Gardner (newsreader) (1932–1999), British television newsreader
Andrew Gardner (American football) (born 1986), American football player
Andy Gardner (footballer, born 1877) (1877–?), Scottish football forward active in the 1900s
Andy Gardner (footballer, born 1888) (1888–1934), Scottish football centre half active in the 1910s

See also
Andrew Gardiner Kane, unionist politician
Gardner (surname)